The following is a list of paleoethnobotanists.

Natàlia Alonso
Jade d'Alpoim Guedes
Ferran Antolín
Eleni Asouti
Jaromír Beneš
Amy Bogaard
Ramon Buxó
Mary Theresa Bonhage-Freund
R.T.J. Cappers
Michael Charles
Gary W. Crawford
Linda Scott Cummings
Andrew Fairbairn
Gayle J. Fritz
Dorian Fuller
Christine A. Hastorf
Andreas G. Heiss
Hans Helbaek
Gordon Hillman
Maria Hopf
Stefanie Jacomet
Glynis Jones
Sabine Karg
Wiebke Kirleis
Mordechai Kislev
Marianne Kohler-Schneider
Udelgard Körber-Grohne
Angela Kreuz
Helmut Kroll
Jutta Lechterbeck
Elena Marinova
Véronique Matterne
Naomi F. Miller
Katharina Neumann
Lee Newsome
Klaus Oeggl
Virginia S. Popper 
Deborah M. Pearsall
Dolores Piperno
Jane Renfrew
Simone Riehl
Manfred Rösch
Irwin Rovner
Marie-Pierre Ruas
Hans-Peter Stika
Ursula Thanheiser
Soultana Maria Valamoti
Marijke van der Veen
Willem van Zeist
Ehud Weiss
George Willcox
Ulrich Willerding
Gisela Wolf
Daniel Zohary

See also
Paleoethnobotany

External links
List of archaeobotanists at the Open Directory

Paleoethnobotanists

Paleoethnobotanist
Archaeobotanists